This is a list of literary critics who wrote works in Urdu. Most of the writers are from Pakistan and India.

List 

 Abdul Aleem
 Abdul Haq (Urdu scholar) 
 Abdul Latif
 Abdul Majid
 Shaikh Abdul Qadir
 Abid Ali Abid
 Abid Hassan Minto
 Abul Khair Kashfi
 Abul Lais Siddiqui
 Ahmad Nadeem Qasmi
 Ahmed Ali
 Akhtar Husain
 Ali Sardar Jafri
 Altaf Hussain Hali
 Faiz Ahmad Faiz
 Farman Fatehpuri
 Firaq Gorakhpuri
 Gopi Chand Narang
 Gyan Chand Jain
 Hafiz Mehmood Khan Shirani
 Hamid Ullah Afsar
 Hasan Askari (writer)
 Ijaz Hussain
 Jamil Jalibi
 Kazi Abdul Wadud
 Majnun Gorakhpuri
 Masud Hassan Rizvi
 Meeraji
 Mir Taqi Mir
 Muhammad Ali Siddiqui
 Muhammad al-Baqir
 Muhammad Husain Azad
 Rasheed Ahmad Siddiqui
 Sajjad Zaheer
 Saleem Ahmed
 Sayyid Shamsullah Qadri
 Shamim Hanafi
 Shamsur Rahman Faruqi
 Shibli Nomani
 Sulaiman Nadvi
 Waheed Qureshi
 Wazir Agha
 Yousuf Hussain Khan

References

External links 
 Works on Urdu Criticism

Urdu critics